The Health Professions Admissions Test (HPAT) is a university admissions test. It is used by all universities in Ireland for admissions to medicine courses, and by the University of Ulster for some medicine related courses.

References

Standardized tests in healthcare education